Alan Kingsbery (born July 23, 1954) is an American former cyclist. He competed in the team time trial event at the 1976 Summer Olympics.

References

1954 births
Living people
American male cyclists
Olympic cyclists of the United States
Cyclists at the 1976 Summer Olympics
Sportspeople from Lima, Ohio